Ek Din 24 Ghante (English: "One Day 24 Hours") is a 2003 Indian Hindi-language thriller film directed and written by Anant Balani and starring Rahul Bose and Nandita Das. The film premiered on 7 November 2003. Director Anant Balani died before the film was released on 29 August 2003. The film is an unauthorised adaptation of the 1998 German film Run Lola Run.

Plot
The film revolves around a father-girl-guy relationship. Sameera Dutta is the wild daughter who comes into conflict with her father when she meets Virendra "Viren". Sameera believes she has found true love, but it happens that Viren has a serious gambling problem and owes Rs. 2 million to a casino owner, Patel. Viren seeks Sameera's help and in desperation and out of resentment for her father she threatens to reveal to her mother that he has a mistress who is pregnant with his child. When her father fails to give her the money, she places a revolver to his head. Her father not only informs the police, but he also hires a hitman to kill his daughter. Meanwhile, a strike cripples the city so Sameera must make her way on foot to the drop-off location to pay off Patel and save Viren's life. After narrowly escaping both the police and her father's hired hitman, Sameera reaches the drop-off. After killing her pursuers, Patel takes the money and lets Viren go. However, Sameera accidentally overhears Viren telling how he staged the whole incident with Patel to obtain her father's money and that their relationship is a sham. After shooting and killing Viren, Sameera walks away.

Cast
Rahul Bose as  Virendra "Viren" Gupta
Nandita Das as Sameera Dutta 
Vinit Kumar as Mr. Karan Patel 
Liliput as Stage actor 
Shilpa Mehta as Mrs. Supriya Dutta 
Piyush Mishra as Police Inspector 
Baby Nidhi as Young Sameera 
Kavita Rathod as Sonia Khandelwal
Kabir Sadanand as Hitman 
Shivkumar Subramaniam as Mr. Vishal Dutta 
Prithvi Zutshi as Mr. Ashwin Kapoor

Reception

Box office
Ek Din grossed around Rs. 30 lakh in its opening weekend.

Critical response
Taran Adarsh of  IndiaFM gave the film 1 out of 5, writing ″none of the performances really manage to stand out. Nandita Das tries hard to lend credence to her role, but doesn't really impress. Rahul Bose looks dispassionate and goes through his part mechanically. Kabir is strictly okay. On the whole, EK DIN 24 GHANTE neither caters to the intelligentsia, nor the hoi polloi.″ Anjum N of Rediff.com wrote ″For all those who love seeing Hollywood-style thrillers made in Hindi, and don't mind the short duration, Ek Din 24 Ghante is worth a watch.″

References

External links
 

2003 films
2000s Hindi-language films
2003 thriller films
Indian remakes of foreign films
Films directed by Anant Balani
Indian thriller films
Hindi-language thriller films